Postiljonen is a dream pop band from Stockholm, Sweden, formed in 2011 by Mia Bøe (Norwegian), Joel Nostrum Holm (Swedish), and Daniel Sjörs (Swedish). The group has released two albums, Skyer and Reverie,  and one remix EP titled All That We Had Is Lost. In addition to original lyrics, the band incorporates sound bites from a variety of films, including The Princess Bride and Breakfast at Tiffany's.

Postiljonen has managed to create a characteristic sound, where ethereal and alluring vocals are interwoven in a mystical, ambient, dreamy and lovable expression. Postiljonen is often compared to the likes of M83, Sigur Rós, JJ and Cocteau Twins.

Background
Postiljonen released their first studio album Skyer in 2013. Their style is often compared to M83 and sometimes The Naked and Famous. The group describes themselves as nostalgic dreamers.

Discography
Skyer (2013)
 All That We Had Is Lost (2014)
 Reverie (Feb 19, 2016)

References

Swedish musical groups
Dream pop musical groups